William "Bill" L. Murdoch (born 1949) is an American Anglican bishop. He is married to Sally and they have three adult children.

Ecclesiastical career
Murdoch has a BS at the University of New Hampshire and a M.Div. at the Gordon-Conwell Theological Seminary. He was ordained first as a Congregational minister and after as an Episcopal priest in May 1986.

He served as rector of the All Saints Episcopal Church in West Newbury, Massachusetts, from 1993 to 2007. During his leadership his congregation experienced an unusual growth. He left the Episcopal Church, with his parish, in 2007, due to his opposition to the ordination on non-celibate homosexual clergy, and he became a Suffragan Bishop of the Anglican Church of Kenya. He was consecrated on August 30, 2007, at All Saints Cathedral, Nairobi, Kenya. He joined the Anglican Church in North America, upon his creation, in June 2009. He became the first Bishop of the Anglican Diocese in New England, in 2009. He resigned as rector of his parish in 2012, to focus on his work as bishop.

He was also adjunct professor at the Gordon-Conwell Theological Seminary. He has led several Alpha Holy Spirit Weekends for Christians of several denominations.

References

External links
Bishop William Murdoch Biography at Anglican Diocese of New England Website

1949 births
Living people
Bishops of the Anglican Church in North America
21st-century Anglican bishops in the United States
Anglican realignment people